The Lords Spiritual (Women) Act 2015 is an Act of Parliament of the United Kingdom. It stipulates that whenever a vacancy arises among the Lords Spiritual during the next ten years after the Act comes into force, the position has to be filled by a woman, if there is one who is eligible. In this case, the Act supersedes section 5 of the Bishoprics Act 1878, which would otherwise require "the issue of a writ of summons to that bishop of a see in England who having been longest bishop of a see in England has not previously become entitled to such writ". It does not apply to the five sees of Canterbury, York, London, Durham or Winchester, which are always represented in the House of Lords.

The Act was passed half a year after the Bishops and Priests (Consecration and Ordination of Women) Measure 2014 authorised the Church of England to appoint women as bishops.

The Act in practice
The first female diocesan bishop, and thus the first female Lord Spiritual due to this Act, was Rachel Treweek in 2015. Consecrated Bishop of Gloucester on 22 July 2015 and enthroned on 19 September 2015, she joined the Lords on 7 September 2015 with the full title The Rt Rev. the Lord Bishop of Gloucester, and was introduced to the House by the Archbishop of Canterbury and the Bishop of London on 26 October 2015. She made her maiden speech on 7 March 2016.

Since then, Christine Hardman (2016), Viv Faull (2018), Libby Lane (2019) and Guli Francis-Dehqani (2021) have also entered the Lords due to this Act shortly after becoming diocesan bishops. Therefore 5 out of 14 vacant Lords positions occurring in the first 7 years of the Act (as of July 2022) have been filled by women. Without the Act, Treweek and Hardman would only have become Lords Spiritual in late 2021.

In addition (and independently of the Act), Sarah Mullally entered the Lords ex officio when appointed Bishop of London in 2018.

See also
List of bishops in the Church of England, which lists the current Lords Spiritual and the seniority of service of the other diocesan bishops
Women in the House of Lords

References

2015 in Christianity
United Kingdom Acts of Parliament 2015
Acts of the Parliament of the United Kingdom concerning the House of Lords
Reform in the United Kingdom
Women bishops
Women's rights in the United Kingdom
2015 in women's history